The 1949 Michigan State Spartans football team represented Michigan State College as an independent the 1949 college football season. In their third season under head coach Clarence Munn, the Spartans compiled a 6–3 record and were ranked No. 19 in the final AP Poll.

After the University of Chicago formally withdrew from the Big Ten Conference in 1946, conference officials began considering other schools to fill the vacancy. In December 1948, conference officials voted unanimously to admit Michigan State College, selecting the Spartans over a competing bid from the University of Pittsburgh. The decision was certified in May 1949, with Spartans' participation slated to begin in the fall of 1950 with the exception of football where their participation was delayed until 1953.

Two Spartans received first-team honors on the 1949 College Football All-America Team. Guard Ed Bagdon was a consensus first-team All-American, and halfback Lynn Chandnois received first-team honors from the International News Service and Collier's Weekly, and second-team honors from the United Press and Football Writers Association of America.

The 1949 Spartans lost their annual rivalry games against Notre Dame by a 34 to 21 score and against Michigan by a 7 to 3 score.

In intersectional play, the Spartans beat Maryland (14–7), William & Mary (42-13), Penn State (24–0), Temple (62–14), and Arizona (75–0), but lost to Oregon State (25–20).

Schedule

References

Michigan State
Michigan State Spartans football seasons
Michigan State Spartans football